is a kind of comic Japanese word play, similar in spirit to a pun that relies on similarities in the pronunciation of words to create a simple joke.

Dajare are popular in advertising. Dajare are also associated with {{nihongo|oyaji gags|親父ギャグ|oyaji gyagu}}, oyaji meaning "old man", as an "old man" would be considered by the younger generation most likely to attempt dajare, making them a near equivalent of what would be called "dad jokes" in English.

Examples

With one speakerExample one: アルミ缶の上にあるみかん (arumi kan no ue ni aru mikan)
 Translation:
 A tangerine on an aluminum can.
 Explanation:
 アルミ (arumi) means "aluminum", 缶 (kan) means "a can", so arumi kan means "an aluminum can". Also ある (aru) means "exists" and みかん (mikan) means "a tangerine (mandarin orange)".

Example two:
 ウランは売らん (uran wa uran)
 Translation:
 I don't sell uranium.
 Explanation:
 ウラン (uran) means uranium, and the second 売らん (uran) = uranai (negative form of uru (to sell)) means "not sell".

Example three:
 ニューヨークで入浴 (nyūyōku de nyūyoku)
 Translation:
 Taking a bath in New York.
 Explanation:
 ニューヨーク (nyūyōku) means New York, 入浴 (nyūyoku) means taking a bath.

Example four:
 レモンの入れもん (remon no iremon)
 Translation:
 A container for a lemon
 Explanation:
 レモン (remon) means "a lemon", 入れもん (iremon) = iremono means "a container".

Example five:
 布団が吹っ飛んだ (Futon ga futtonda)
 Translation:
 Futon was blown away.
 Explanation:
 布団 (Futon) means "a Japanese style mattress", 吹っ飛んだ (futtonda) means being blown away.

With two speakers
Example one:
 A: 大食いのたけし君も、宇宙ではあまり物を食べられないよ。 (ōgui no takeshi kun mo, uchū dewa amari mono o taberarenaiyo)
 B: なぜ? (naze)
 A: 宇宙には空気(食う気)がない。 (uchū niwa kūki ga nai)
 Translation:
 A: In space, even a glutton like Takeshi can't eat anything.
 B: Why's that?
 A: In space, he has no appetite.
 Explanation:
 Kūki (くうき) can mean either "air" (空気) or "will to eat" (食う気), thus what sounds like a perfectly reasonable statement – "in space there is no air"  – takes on a much stronger meaning when said in context.

Example two:
 A: 向こうの通りにヘイができたんだってね。(mukou no tōri ni hei ga dekitan datte ne)
 B: へぇー。(hee...)
 Translation:
 A: I hear they finished the wall on the street over there.
 B: Well!
 Explanation:
 The word for "fence" or "wall" here (塀, hei) sounds very similar to the Japanese interjection hee (へえ, similar in usage to the phrases "oh yeah?" and "well!"), thus the answer sounds like a repeat of the information in the initial statement.
 Another version of this same joke replaces hei with kakoi (囲い), which sounds similar to a word meaning something like "cool" or "looks good" (かっこいい).

Children's dajare (with one speaker)
There are also some jokes mostly used by children that resemble dajare. These are also considered jokes that "everybody knows" in most parts of Japan.  These are examples of ginatayomi (ぎなた読み), which relies on ambiguity in where one word ends and another begins.

Example one:
 A: パンつくったことある？ (pan tsukutta koto aru?)
 Translation:
 A: Have you ever made bread before?
 Can also be interpreted as:
 A: Have you ever eaten underpants before? (パンツ食ったことある？, pantsu kutta koto aru?)

Example two:
 A: ねぇ、ちゃんとお風呂入ってる？ (nee, chanto ofuro haitteru?)
 Translation:
 A: Hey, have you been taking a bath (regularly)?
Can also be interpreted as:
 A: Do you take baths with your (older) sister? (姉ちゃんとお風呂入ってる？, nee-chan to ofuro haitteru?; the casual nee combined with the adverb chanto sounds the same as nee-chan to meaning "with your (older) sister".)

See also
Owarai
 Homophone
 Japanese superstitions

External links
http://www.kanjiclinic.com/kc72final.htm Discussion of some dajare seen in advertising promotions in Japan
http://www2.odn.ne.jp/d-palace/index2_e.htm Dajare palace, some English
http://dajare.jp/ Dajare Station - Portal Site of Japanese Dajare

Japanese word games
Humour

ja:駄洒落